This is a list of hydrodynamic and plasma instabilities named after people (eponymous instabilities).

See also
 Eponym
 List of fluid flows named after people 
 Instability
 Hydrodynamic stability
 Scientific phenomena named after people

References
 Chandrashekhar, S., Hydrodynamic and Hydromagnetic Stability, Dover Publications, New York (1981).
 Drazin, P. G. and W. H. Reid, Hydrodynamic Stability, Cambridge Univ. Press, London (1981).

 
Hydrodynamic instabilities
Fluid dynamics
Fluid dynamic instabilities